William O'Leary (died 1955) was an Irish Fianna Fáil politician. A farmer and vintner, he was first elected to Dáil Éireann as a Fianna Fáil Teachta Dála (TD) for the Kerry constituency at the June 1927 general election. He was re-elected at the September 1927 general election. He did not contest the 1932 general election.

References

Year of birth missing
1955 deaths
Fianna Fáil TDs
Members of the 5th Dáil
Members of the 6th Dáil
Irish farmers